Bangla Tribune is a Bengali language news website of Bangladesh.  It started its journey on 13 May 2014. It's edited by Zulfiqer Russell and published by Kazi Anis Ahmed. As of July 2021, its Alexa ranking was #16 in Bangladesh and #3,064 globally. The website covers a wide range of topics, including politics, business, entertainment, sports, and technology. It also features a variety of columnists and opinion writers who provide their perspectives on current events.

History
Bangla Tribune along with Dhaka Tribune, a national English-language daily broadsheet of Bangladesh are owned by 2A Media Limited. As a concern of Gemcon Group and Kazi Anis Ahmed is the publisher of both newspapers. Its slogan says "All news in minimum words" (in Bengali "Alpa Khotai Shob Khota").

Recognition
Reporters of Bangla Tribune have received multiple accolades for their anti-drug reports. In 2007, Shafiqul Islam received the Progga Tobacco Control Journalism Award. In 2015, Udisa Islam received the Prothom Alo Best Anti-Drug Report for her anti-drug reporting.

References

See also
 Dhaka Tribune

External links

2014 establishments in Bangladesh
Bangladeshi news websites